In graph theory a minimum spanning tree (MST)  of a graph  with  and  is a tree subgraph of  that contains all of its vertices and is of minimum weight. 

MSTs are useful and versatile tools utilised in a wide variety of practical and theoretical fields. For example, a company looking to supply multiple stores with a certain product from a single warehouse might use an MST originating at the warehouse to calculate the shortest paths to each company store. In this case the stores and the warehouse are represented as vertices and the road connections between them - as edges. Each edge is labelled with the length of the corresponding road connection.

If  is edge-unweighted every spanning tree possesses the same number of edges and thus the same weight. It is not necessarily unique. More generally, graphs that are not necessarily connected have minimum spanning forests, which consist of a union of MSTs for each connected component. 

As finding MSTs is a widespread problem in graph theory, there exist many sequential algorithms for solving it. Among them are Prim's, Kruskal's and Borůvka's algorithms, each utilising different properties of MSTs. However, as practical problems are often quite large (road networks sometimes have billions of edges), performance is a key factor. One option of improving it is by parallelising known MST algorithms.

Prim's algorithm 

This algorithm utilises the cut-property of MSTs. A simple high-level pseudocode implementation is provided below:

 
  where  is a random vertex in 
 repeat  times
     find lightest edge  s.t.  but 
     
     
 return T

Each edge is observed exactly twice - namely when examining each of its endpoints. Each vertex is examined exactly once for a total of  operations aside from the selection of the lightest edge at each loop iteration. This selection is often performed using a priority queue (PQ). For each edge at most one decreaseKey operation (amortised in ) is performed and each loop iteration performs one deleteMin operation.

It is important to note that the loop is inherently sequential and can not be properly parallelised. Thus no two selections of a lightest edge can be performed at the same time. However, there do exist some attempts at parallelisation.

Kruskal's algorithm 

Kruskal's MST algorithm utilises the cycle property of MSTs. A high-level pseudocode representation is provided below.

  forest with every vertex in its own subtree
 foreach  in ascending order of weight
         
 return T

Here  denotes the single-valued inverse Ackermann function, for which any realistic input yields an integer less than five.

Approach 1: Parallelising the sorting step 

Similarly to Prim's algorithm there are components in Kruskal's approach that can not be parallelised in its classical variant. For example, determining whether or not two vertices are in the same subtree is difficult to parallelise, as two union operations might attempt to join the same subtrees at the same time. Really the only opportunity for parallelisation lies in the sorting step.

Approach 2: Filter-Kruskal 

Another approach would be to modify the original algorithm by growing  more aggressively. This idea was presented by Osipov et al. The basic idea behind Filter-Kruskal is to partition the edges in a similar way to quicksort and filter out edges that connect vertices that belong to the same tree in order to reduce the cost of sorting. A high-level pseudocode representation is provided below.

 filterKruskal():
 if  KruskalThreshold:
     return kruskal()
 pivot = chooseRandom()
 , partition(pivot)
  filterKruskal()
  filter()
   filterKruskal()
 return 
 
 partition(pivot):
  
 
 foreach :
     if weight()  pivot:
          
     else
         
 return
 
 filter():
 
 foreach :
     if find-set(u)  find-set(v):
         
 return 

Filter-Kruskal is better suited for parallelisation, since sorting, partitioning and filtering have intuitively easy parallelisations where the edges are simply divided between the cores.

Borůvka's algorithm 

The main idea behind Borůvka's algorithm is edge contraction. These new edges retain their old edge weights. If the goal is not just to determine the weight of an MST but also which edges it comprises, it must be noted between which pairs of vertices an edge was contracted. A high-level pseudocode representation is presented below. 

 
 while 
      
     for 
           lightest 
     for 
         contract 
     
 return T

It is possible that contractions lead to multiple edges between a pair of vertices. However, if all contractions that share a vertex are performed in parallel this is doable.

Parallelisation 

One possible parallelisation of this algorithm yields a polylogarithmic time complexity, i.e.  and there exists a constant  so that . Here  denotes the runtime for a graph with  edges,  vertices on a machine with  processors. The basic idea is the following:

 while 
     find lightest incident edges // 
     assign the corresponding subgraph to each vertex // 
     contract each subgraph // 

The MST then consists of all the found lightest edges. 

Finding the lightest incident edge 

First the edges are distributed between each of the  processors. Furthermore, each processor needs to know to which vertex these edges belong (since  only stores one of the edge's endpoints) and stores this in the array . Obtaining this information is possible in  using  binary searches or in  using a linear search. In practice the latter approach is sometimes quicker, even though it is asymptotically worse.

Now each processor determines the lightest edge incident to each of its vertices.

  find()
 for 
     if 
         
     if
         

Here the issue arises some vertices are handled by more than one processor. A possible solution to this is that every processor has its own  array which is later combined with those of the others using a reduction.

Assigning subgraphs to vertices 

Observe the graph that consists solely of edges collected in the previous step. These edges are directed away from the vertex to which they are the lightest incident edge. The resulting graph decomposes into multiple weakly connected components. The goal of this step is to assign to each vertex the component of which it is a part. Note that every vertex has exactly one outgoing edge and therefore each component is a pseudotree - a tree with a single extra edge that runs in parallel to the lightest edge in the component but in the opposite direction. The following code mutates this extra edge into a loop:

 parallel forAll  
     
     if  
         

Now every weakly connected component is a directed tree where the root has a loop. This root is chosen as the representative of each component. The following code uses doubling to assign each vertex its representative:

 while 
     forAll  
         

Now every subgraph is a star. With some advanced techniques this step needs  time.

Contracting the subgraphs 

In this step each subgraph is contracted to a single vertex. 

  number of subgraphs
 
 find a bijective function  star root  
 

Finding the bijective function is possible in  using a prefix sum.

Complexity 

If  then it is absolutely efficient.

Further algorithms 

There are multiple other parallel algorithms that deal the issue of finding an MST. Bader and Cong presented an MST-algorithm, that was five times quicker on eight cores than an optimal sequential algorithm.

Another challenge is the External Memory model - there is a proposed algorithm due to Dementiev et al. that is claimed to be only two to five times slower than an algorithm that only makes use of internal memory

References 

Spanning tree
Parallel computing